The Late Blossom is a 1977 Canadian drama film directed by André Brassard and written by his long-time collaborator, playwright Michel Tremblay. It was entered into the 10th Moscow International Film Festival.

Plot
30-year-old Quebec City native Gisèle (Rita Lafontaine) lives a quiet life as a secretary without happiness with her parents and siblings. One day, tired of being teased by her office mates, she decides to consult a marriage agency to find her soul mate.

Cast
 Rita Lafontaine as Gisèle Lapointe
 Denise Filiatrault as Marguerite Lapointe-Beaulieu
 Huguette Oligny as Marie Lapointe
 Claude Gai as Jacques Lapointe
 Jean Mathieu as Joseph Lapointe
 Danièle Panneton as Danielle Lapointe
 François Tassé as Claude Beaulieu
 Edgar Fruitier as Le patron de l'agence
 Sylvie Heppel as La femme du patron de l'agence
 Andrée St-Laurent as La secrétaire de l'agence
 Paule Baillargeon as Ginette
 Josée Labossière as Mariette
 Gilles Renaud as Yvon Thériault

References

External links
 

1977 films
1977 drama films
Canadian drama films
Films directed by André Brassard
Works by Michel Tremblay
French-language Canadian films
1970s Canadian films